Erigeron mariposanus is a rare species of flowering plant in the family Asteraceae known by the common names foothill fleabane, Mariposa daisy, or Mariposa erigeron. It has been found only in a few locations in Mariposa County in California. Some sources say that it is now probably extinct.

Erigeron mariposanus is a perennial herb up to 28 centimeters (11 inches) tall, producing a woody taproot. The leaves and the stem are covered with hairs. The plant generally produces 1-4 flower heads per stem, each head with up to 22 blue ray florets surrounding numerous yellow disc florets.

References

Flora of California
mariposanus
Plants described in 1900